Manjari Fadnis (also spelled Phadnis and Fadnnis) is an Indian actress who predominantly appeared in Hindi films, in addition to Telugu films. She is best known for her performance in the 2008 Hindi film Jaane Tu... Ya Jaane Na. Her other notable films are Faltu (2006), Zokkomon (2011), Warning (2013), Grand Masti (2013), Kis Kisko Pyaar Karoon (2015), a short film Khamakha (2016) and 'Barot House' (2019).

Career

Fadnis was first seen on television during the second season of the Indian version of the singing reality show Popstars, which was aired on Channel [v] India in 2003. She was one of the participants who made it to the finals for the musical band Aasma.

She started her film career with Rok Sako To Rok Lo in 2004, but her big break was Jaane Tu... Ya Jaane Na (2008) as the lead actor's girlfriend. The film was successful with the audience and also enjoyed critical acclaim. Earlier she was part of the National Film Award-winning Bengali feature film Faltu (2006) and also Mumbai Salsa (2007). In 2008, she made a debut in Telugu films with Siddu From Sikakulam, following which her first Tamil film Muthirai (2009) got released. Notably, she had sung a Tamil song under the direction of Yuvan Shankar Raja for the film Muthirai. In September 2009, she signed to appear in a series of Onida Television commercials.

Fadnis' 2010 releases were the Telugu films Inkosaari and Shubhapradham. She then starred in the Walt Disney-produced superhero film Zokkomon, starring Darsheel Safary in the titular role. The film received positive reviews from critics. She also worked in the Telugu film Shakti (2011) alongside Jr. NTR, and later in a Hindi film I M 24 (2012) and her debut Kannada film Munjane (2012). The year 2013 saw release of her films Warning, a 3D underwater film and Grand Masti (opposite Aftab Shivdasani). Grand Masti was the highest grossing Bollywood film with an A (Adults Only) certificate in India. Her next film was Mohanlal starred Mr. Fraud (2014), which marked her Malayalam debut. Then came her romantic comedy film Kis Kisko Pyaar Karoon (2015) starring Kapil Sharma. The film was a box office success. She then acted alongside Shreyas Talpade in the content driven film Wah Taj (2016). The movie had a dance song "Chori Chichori" for which Fadnis attired as traditional Marathi Mulgi did a semi-folk popular dance. She also worked in her maiden Marathi film Sarv Mangal Savdhan (2016) opposite Raqesh Vashisth. She appeared as a lead actress in the inspirational film Jeena Isi Ka Naam Hai (2017) starring Arbaaz Khan, Himansh Kohli and Ashutosh Rana, set in exotic locations. In 2018, she came up with a murder mystery film Nirdosh opposite Ashmit Patel and an action comedy film Baa Baaa Black Sheep opposite Manish Paul.

In 2019, she appeared in an Amit Sadh starred thriller web-film Barot House aired on ZEE5.

In 2017, her short film Khamakha (2016) won the Filmfare for Best Short Film People's Choice Award. Her other short films are The Morning After (2013), The Cot (2017), Jackie Shroff starred The Playboy Mr Sawhney (2018) and Interdependence: Megha's divorce (2019).

In 2019, she appeared in a web series Fuh Se Fantasy:The Blindfold on Voot.

She made her first theatrical performance Double Deal Reloaded (English), in Mumbai in 2017 and the following year in Kolkata, Bengaluru and Hyderabad. In 2018, she came up with a musical drama Devdas staged at Mumbai.

Fadnis sang a duet Tamil song Azhagana Neeyum under the direction of Yuvan Shankar Raja for the film Muthirai (2009). She also sang the duet songs Sonya Ve Sajna in the Indo-Pakistani music album Beat Beyond Borders composed by Pakistani musician Fakhar-e-Alam in 2012 and Ga Raha Hai Ye Aasma composed by Raghav Sachar in 2014. In 2015, she lent her vocals for a duet Marathi song composed by Nikhil Kamat for the film Sarv Mangal Savdhan. She recorded her first solo song Alvida composed by the musical duo of Arif-Troy in 2017.

She was the cover girl for Woman's Era Magazine September 2015 issue. She has also appeared in various fashion events such as Bombay Times Fashion week 2018, Intimate Fashion Week 2017, and Dubai Fashion League 2017. She was cast in 'Hyundai i10 car' TV advertisement with Shah Rukh Khan of Main Hoon Na and Om Shanti Om fame in May 2012. Earlier, she had appeared in a series of Onida Television commercials in 2009 and later on in iball pen drives TV ad in 2011, Mehfil Southall Hotel/Restaurant/Banquet TV ads in 2015 . She has also been featured in the music videos Beat Beyond Borders (2011) and Raghav Sachar feat (2014).

She has undergone dance training under Shiamak Davar and vocal training under Sucheta Bhattacharjee.

She received the Movers and Shakers award at the MAAC 24FPS International Animation Awards 2015. In 2020, she received the Youth Icon Award for 'Excellency in Entertainment industry' at Maier Medi International Short Film Festival, Pune.

Early life

Fadnis, who comes from a Maharashtrian family, was born at Sagar, Madhya Pradesh to Ruchi Fadnis and Col Bharat Kumar Fadnis. As her father served in the Indian Army, a transferable service, she grew up with her only sibling Gagan Fadnis in Shimla, Jammu, Delhi, Mumbai and Pune (her hometown).

Filmography

Feature films

Short films

Web-series

Television

Albums

Theatre

Awards and nominations

Charity and social causes

Fadnis participated in the fashion show 'Umeed-Ek Koshish-A Starwalk for Charity' in 2012 and Amy Billimoria's 'The Walk of Pride' Charity show in 2015. Earlier in 2012, she graced the Global Peace Fashion Show to commemorate the victims of 26/11 Mumbai terror attacks. She was also part of the Zee TV environmental awareness initiative My Earth My Duty in 2013. She volunteered for the Punjab Kesari 'Selfie with Daughter' campaign to address the importance of saving a girl child in 2016. In 2017, she adopted two kittens and a puppy namely Mia, Simba and Pari to emphasize animal welfare. In 2018, she wrote an open letter to the Prime Minister expressing her concern about safety of women in India. Same year, she volunteered to emphasize celebrating Ganesh Chaturthi with Eco-friendly Ganesha idol. In 2019, she participated in an event held at Mumbai concerning Digital Detoxification. The same year, she actively volunteered for the Save Aarey Forest campaign. She later on appeared in  United Nations sponsored short film Interdependence to raise awareness regarding climate change.

References

External links

 

Living people
Marathi people
Actresses in Hindi cinema
Actresses in Tamil cinema
Actresses in Telugu cinema
Actresses in Kannada cinema
Actresses in Bengali cinema
Indian film actresses
21st-century Indian actresses
Actresses from Pune
Actresses in Malayalam cinema
Actresses in Marathi cinema
Female models from Maharashtra
Tamil playback singers
Indian women pop singers
1984 births